Labarrère (Gascon: La Barrèra) is a former commune in the Gers department in southwestern France. On 1 January 2016, it was merged into the new commune Castelnau-d'Auzan-Labarrère.

Population

See also
Communes of the Gers department

References

Former communes of Gers
Populated places disestablished in 2016